The 2006–07 Florida Gators men's basketball team represented the University of Florida in the sport of basketball during the 2006–07 college basketball season.  The Gators competed in Division I of the National Collegiate Athletic Association (NCAA) and the Eastern Division of the Southeastern Conference (SEC).  They were led by head coach Billy Donovan, and played their home games in the O'Connell Center on the university's Gainesville, Florida campus.

The Gators were looking to repeat as national champions.  The Gators finished the season with a 26–5 record entering the SEC Championship.  They won all three games and received the No. 1 overall seed in the NCAA tournament. They played in the National Championship game against Ohio State. They beat them 84–75 to become the first team since Duke in 1992 to repeat as National Champions. They remain, as of the 2023 tournament, the most recent team to repeat as National Champions.

Class of 2006

|-
| colspan="7" style="padding-left:10px;" | Overall Recruiting Rankings:     Scout – 22     Rivals – 20       ESPN – 
|}

Roster

Coaches

Schedule and results

|-
!colspan=8 style=| Exhibition

|-
!colspan=8 style=| Regular season

|-
!colspan=8 style=| SEC Tournament

|-
!colspan=8 style=| NCAA Division I Tournament

Rankings

*AP does not release post-NCAA tournament rankings.

Regular season
The Gators started the regular season trying to repeat as National Champions. They returned all five starters since none of them decided to go into the NBA early. They won their first few games, then they lost to Kansas in Las Vegas. On December 13, Junior Al Horford injured his ankle in practice, and missed a few games in December. Horford however, was able to play against Ohio State, on December 23. The Ohio State-Florida game was a high anticipated match-up, featuring 3 of the top big men in the country(Horford, Joakim Noah, and Greg Oden). The Gators held Oden to 7 points and went on to win 86–60. The Gators entered SEC play with a 13–2 record. They started out dominating the SEC. With a 12–0 SEC record the Gators headed to Nashville, Tennessee to take on the Vanderbilt Commodores. They had 17 straight wins, close to a school record, when they lost to Vanderbilt 70–83.

Accomplishments

Then longest winning streak in school history – 18 games (3 times) (2005/6, 2006/7, since broken by 2013-14 Gators)
Consecutive 20 + win seasons – 9 years in a row (1998/9-2006/7)
Then the most wins in school history prior to NCAA tournament – 29 (2006/7, since broken by 2013-14 Gators)
Then the most wins in a season in school history – 35 (2006/7, since broken by 2013-14 Gators)
Combined 68–11 record over two years (2005/6 – 2006/7)
Led nation in field goal percentage (2005/6, 2006/7)
All 5 starters with positive assists/turnover ratio (2005/6, 2006/7)
All 5 starters with 1,000 + career points scored (2006/7)
2nd out-right SEC regular season championship (2006/7)
Consecutive SEC tournament championships – 3 years in a row (2004/5–2006/7)
Consecutive SEC tournament title games – 4 years in a row (2003/4–2006/7)
SEC record 6 consecutive wins over Kentucky Wildcats (2004/5-2006/7)
Consecutive appearances in NCAA tournament – 9 years in a row (1998/9–2006/7)
Two consecutive appearances in NCAA Final Four (2005/6, 2006/7)
First NCAA national championship (2005/6)
Second NCAA national championship (2006/7)
Highest seed (#1) ever in NCAA tournament (2006/7)
One of 3 teams (UF, Duke, Kansas) to be #6 seed or higher 9 years in a row
Champs of Coaches vs. Cancer Classic tournament in Madison Sq. Garden (2005/6)
Coaches vs. Cancer Classic MVP – Green (2005/6)
SEC Co-Defensive Player of the Year – Brewer (2005/6)
SEC 6th Man of the Year – Richard (2006/7)
SEC tournament MVP – Green (2005/6)
SEC tournament team – Green, Brewer (2005/6)
SEC tournament MVP – Horford (2006/7)
SEC tournament team – Horford, Noah, Brewer, Green (2006/7)
Never trailed in all 3 SEC tournament games
3 SEC Players of the Week – Green and Noah (twice) (2005/6)
2 SEC Players of the Week – Humphrey and Brewer (2006/7)
SEC Scholar Athlete of the Year – Humphrey (twice)
ESPN First Team Academic All-American – Humphrey
NCAA Minneapolis Regional MVP – Noah (2005/6)
NCAA Minneapolis Regional All-Regional Team – Noah, Green, Horford (2005/6)
NCAA Final Four MOP – Noah (2005/6)
First player with 4 or more blocks in all 6 NCAA Tournament games – Noah (2005/6)
NCAA tournament individual record 29 blocks – Noah (2005/6)
NCAA Final Four individual record 10 blocks – Noah (2005/6)
NCAA Championship Game individual record 6 blocks – Noah (2005/6)
NCAA tournament 2nd place team record 44 blocks (2005/6)
3rd youngest coach to win NCAA title – Coach Donovan (2005/6)
First team since UCLA in 1968 to win both Final Four games by 15+ points (2005/6)
NCAA Midwest Regional MVP – Green (2006/7)
NCAA Midwest Regional All-Regional Team – Green, Humphrey (2006/7)
NCAA Tournament record + 43 (62–19) rebound margin vs Jackson St (2006/6)
NCAA Final Four MOP – Brewer (2006/7)
NCAA Final Four record 17 rebounds vs. UCLA – Horford (2006/7)
84.6% shooting percentage in NCAA tournament – Richard (2006/7) (better than Laettner's 78.8% in 1989, but not enough shots to hold record)
NCAA Tournament career record 47 3-point shots – Humphrey (2003/4-2006/7)
NCAA Tournament career 4th place 41 blocked shots – Noah (2004/5-2006/7)
First team since Duke (91–92) to win back-to-back NCAA titles (2005/6-2006/7)
First group of 5 starters to win back-to-back NCAA titles (2005/6-2006/7)
2nd most consecutive NCAA tournament wins (12) since expansion (2005/6-2006/7)
Never trailed in second half of 4 Final Four games (2005/6-2006/7)
Average scoring margin of +12.5 points in 4 Final Four games (2005/6-2006/7)
Average scoring margin of +15.1 points in 12 NCAA T games (2005/6-2006/7)
School record 37 consecutive foul shots – Green (2005/6)
School record 113 3-point shots in a season – Humphrey (2005/6, 2006/7)
School record 39 consecutive games with 3-point shot – Humphrey (2006/7)
School record only triple double – Brewer (2005/6)[/COLOR]
Then school record 288 career 3-point shots – Humphrey (2003/4-2006/7, since broken by Kenny Boynton from 2009/10-2012/3)
School record 112 career wins – Humphrey, Richard (2003/4-2006/7
School record 141 career games played – Richard (2003/4-2006/7)
School record 261 career wins – Coach Donovan (1995/6-2006/7)
School record 22 career NCAA tournament wins – Coach Donovan [/COLOR]
School record 112 points scored in a tournament game – UF vs Jackson St. (2006/7)
School record 71 points scored in a half – UF vs Jackson St., 2nd half (2006/7)
School record 9 assists in a half – Taurean Green, UF vs Jackson St., 2nd half (2006/7)
School record 62–19 rebounding margin – UF vs Jackson St. (2006/7)
School record most points in NCAA tournament career – Brewer (2006/7)
18 post-season wins in a row (2005/6-2006/7)
22–1 post-season record in the last three years (2004/5-2006/7)
14 consecutive wins in a dome, including national semis and finals (2004/5-2006/6)
19 consecutive wins in the O'Connell Center
NBA Draft record, with three players in Top 9 selections

References

Florida Gators men's basketball seasons
Florida
Florida Gators men's basketball team
Florida Gators men's basketball team
NCAA Division I men's basketball tournament Final Four seasons
NCAA Division I men's basketball tournament championship seasons
Florida